Youssef Salimi (born August 24, 1972 in Arles, France) is a former Algerian football player who played as a central defender and spent almost his entire career with OGC Nice. He scored OGC Nice's only goal in their triumphant 1997 Coupe de France Final. He finished his career by making one Alpha Ethniki appearance for Ethnikos Asteras during 2000.

Club career
 1991-1999 OGC Nice 
 2000 Ethnikos Asteras F.C.

Honours

Club
OGC Nice
 Coupe de France: 1997

References

1972 births
Living people
Algerian footballers
Algeria international footballers
French sportspeople of Algerian descent
Ligue 1 players
Ligue 2 players
OGC Nice players
Ethnikos Asteras F.C. players
Expatriate footballers in Greece
Algerian expatriates in Greece
Association football defenders